Christopher Allport (born Alexander Wise Allport Jr.; June 17, 1947 – January 25, 2008) was an American actor.

Biography
Alexander Wise Allport Jr. was born in Boston. His acting life began at the age of nine in New Canaan, Connecticut, at the Children's Theatre. While at Northwestern University, he worked with director Paul Sills and Story Theatre. He performed in New York with the Public Theater at Lincoln Center, and with Ensemble Studio Theatre; and in Los Angeles at the Taper, South Coast Repertory and with Padua Playwrights. In 2007, he wrote and starred in "The Backroad Home", a theatrical memoir with his original music, directed and developed by Paul Linke and produced by his wife, Susan Hayden (Ruskin Group Theatre).

One of his earliest television roles was as Tim McGowan on the soap opera Another World (1973–74). Around 1975 or 1976, Allport did a screen test with actress Amy Irving for the parts of Han Solo and Princess Leia, respectively, for the upcoming filming of the 1977 movie Star Wars. Neither actor got the parts, which went to Harrison Ford and Carrie Fisher, respectively.

His film credits include Savage Weekend, To Live and Die in L.A., Jack Frost, Jack Frost 2: Revenge of the Mutant Killer Snowman, and Garden Party, which was released in 2008. He died shortly after the latter film was completed.
  
His list of television credits includes appearances on such programs as Midnight Caller, The X-Files, Commander In Chief, ER, Felicity, Mad Men, and Brothers & Sisters.

His role as Andrew Campbell on Mad Men was set to be a recurring one, though he only got to appear in one episode (season one, episode 4: "New Amsterdam"). In season two, after Allport's death, they killed off his character in the American Airlines crash storyline, and later, dedicated the show to him.

Personal life
Allport was married to novelist Susan Hayden at the time of his death. He had two sons: Andrew (from a previous marriage to writer/actress Carolyn Allport) and Mason, his son from his marriage to Hayden.

Allport had written a story about the pleasures of backcountry skiing in the Los Angeles Times in 2004 in which he stated that "any excursion into the mountains requires awareness. Have fun, but be careful."

Death
On January 25, 2008, Allport was one of three men killed by three avalanches near the Mountain High ski resort in Wrightwood, San Bernardino County, California (in the San Gabriel Mountains). There were two other fatalities: Michael McKay, an off-duty member of the resort's ski patrol, and Darin Bodie Coffey. A fourth man, snowboarder Oscar Gonzales, escaped after getting lost and hitting a rock.

Allport played Pete Campbell's father, Andrew, on the 2007–15 drama series Mad Men during season one. Following Allport's death, the writers of Mad Men had to kill his character, doing so in 'Flight One', where Andrew Campbell is one of those killed in the crash of American Airlines Flight 1 in Jamaica Bay, New York, following take-off on March 1, 1962. The episode is dedicated in Allport's memory.

Selected filmography

Man on a Swing (1974) – Richie Tom Keating
Savage Weekend (1976) - Nicky
The Lincoln Conspiracy (1977) – Michael O'Laughlin
City in Fear (1980) – Kenny Reiger
Circle of Power (1981) – Jack Nilsson
Dead & Buried (1981) – George Le Moyne / Freddie
Who Will Love My Children? (1983) – Kenneth Handy
Special Bulletin (1983) – Steven Levitt
To Live and Die in L.A. (1985) – Max Waxman
Spiker (1986) – Newt Steinbech
Invaders from Mars (1986) – Captain Curtis
Alex Haley's Queen (1993) – Union Officer
Jack Frost (1997) – Sam Tiler
Jack Frost 2: Revenge of the Mutant Killer Snowman (2000) – Sam Tiler
Garden Party (2008) – Davey Diamond (final film role)

References

External links

Variety Magazine: Actor Christopher Allport dies at 60

1947 births
2008 deaths
American male television actors
American male film actors
Male actors from Boston
Natural disaster deaths in California
Northwestern University alumni
Deaths in avalanches
20th-century American male actors